Online Binline is a 2015 Marathi language romcom film directed by Kedar Prabhakar Gaekwad. The film had its theatrical release on 3 July 2015. It stars Siddharth Chandekar, Rutuja Shinde and Hemant Dhome in lead.

Synopsis
Online Binline shows how two friends fall in love with the same girl, and how they set off on a mission to achieve the love of their life, using internet.

Cast
 Siddharth Chandekar as Sid 
 Rutuja Shinde as Kimaya
 Hemant Dhome as Idya
 Arun Nalawade as Idya's Father
 Prasad Kamat as Sid's Father
 Pratibha Bhagat as Idya's mother

Soundtrack

The soundtrack is composed by Hrishikesh, Saurabh, Jasraj, Nilesh Moharir and Lesle Lewis while the lyrics were written by Vaibhav Joshi and Mandar Cholkar. Hrishikesh, Saurabh, Jasraj compose only one track of the film and other three tracks composed by Nilesh Moharir. The song Oho Kai Zala song composed arranged by Lesle Lewis written by Shreyash Jadhav and Mandar Cholkar originally written by Munawar Masoom, Milind Joshi exclusively released on 17 June 2015.

Critical reception

Mihir Bhanage of The Times of India gave the film a rating of 2.5 out of 5 saying that, "There are funny situations, romantic pursuits and a social message to the younger generation- that of preventing mobiles and internet addiction- but weaving this together is where it takes a beating."

References

External links
 

2015 films
Indian comedy films
2010s Marathi-language films